"Losing Me" is a song by English singer-songwriters Gabrielle Aplin and JP Cooper, released through Never Fade Records and AWAL on 14 August 2019 as the third single from the former's third studio album, Dear Happy (2020).

Background
On 8 August 2019, Aplin announced the release of her new single on social media. The song was produced by Lostboy and Mike Spencer. Talking about the song, Aplin said, "Losing Me is about what you wish you could hear when you're having a particularly hard time, while also being that voice to someone else who needs it. It's about remaining connected when there is so much in modern life that can give the illusion of oneness whilst making us feel more alone. I've been a huge fan of JP Cooper for years and I'm so happy he agreed to be on this song with me. I saw JP play an acoustic set at a festival three years ago I've wanted to work with him ever since."

Music video
A music video to accompany the release of "Losing Me" was first released onto YouTube on 15 August 2019. Aplin said that the inspiration behind the video is how in the modern world, even when we're surrounded by people and things we can still feel desensitised and disconnected from everything going on.

Charts

Release history

References

2016 songs
2016 singles
Gabrielle Aplin songs
JP Cooper songs
Songs written by Gabrielle Aplin
Songs written by JP Cooper